Admiral Sir Thomas Graves KB (c.1747 – 29 March 1814) was an officer of the Royal Navy who rose to the rank of admiral after service in the Seven Years' War, the American War of Independence, and the French Revolutionary and Napoleonic Wars.

Family and early life
Thomas Graves was born circa 1747, the third son of Reverend John Graves of Castle Dawson, County Londonderry, by his wife Jane Hudson. He was a nephew of Admiral Samuel Graves and a first cousin once removed of Admiral Thomas, Lord Graves. Graves' three brothers all served as captains in the navy, becoming admirals on the superannuated list. It is stated in Foster's Peerage that he was born in 1752, a date incompatible with the facts of his known service: by the Regulations of the Navy he was bound to be twenty years old at the date of his promotion, and though the order was often grossly infringed, it is highly improbable that he was only thirteen: it may fairly be assumed that he was at least eighteen in 1765.

Arctic seas and North America
In the following year he went out to North America with his uncle Samuel, and was appointed by him to command , one of the small schooners employed for the prevention of smuggling. She had thirty men, with an armament of four 2-pounder guns, and on 27 May 1775, being sent from Boston into the Charles River, was attacked by a large force of insurgents, whose numbers swelled till they reached a total of something like two thousand men, with two field-pieces. It fell calm, and towards midnight, as the tide ebbed, Diana ran aground, and lay over on her side, when the colonial forces succeeded in setting her on fire, and the small crew, after a gallant defence, were compelled to abandon her, Graves having been first severely burnt, as well as his brother John, then a lieutenant of the flagship , who had been sent in one of the Prestons boats to support Diana.

Promotion and further service
After this Graves continued to be employed in command of other tenders in the neighbourhood of Boston and Rhode Island until, on the recall of his uncle, he rejoined Preston and returned to England; but was again sent out to the North American station in the same ship, commanded by Commodore William Hotham. In 1779 he was promoted to the command of the sloop  on the West Indian and North American stations, and in May 1781 he was advanced to post rank. In the temporary absence of Commodore Edmund Affleck, he commanded  in the Battle of the Chesapeake on 5 September, and continuing afterwards in Bedford, as Affleck's flag captain, was present in the engagement at St. Kitts on 26 January 1782, and in the Battle of the Saintes on 9 and 12 April, in which last Bedford had a very distinguished part.

In the following autumn Graves was appointed to the frigate HMS Magicienne, in which, on 2 January 1783, he fought a very severe action with the French , which was encumbered with a second ship's company which she was carrying to the Chesapeake. Both frigates were reduced to a wreck, and so parted; Magicienne to get to Jamaica a fortnight later; Sybille to be captured on 22 January 1783 by Hussar under Thomas McNamara Russell.

Years of peace and the French Revolutionary Wars
During the peace Graves spent much of his time in France, and in the early years of the French Revolutionary Wars had no employment. It was not until October 1800 that he was appointed to command the 74-gun , in the Channel Fleet, under the orders of Lord St. Vincent. This was only for a few months; for on 1 January 1801 he was promoted to be Rear-Admiral of the White Squadron, and in March hoisted his flag on board the 64-gun , one of the fleet proceeding to the Baltic with Sir Hyde Parker.

Flag rank and later life
For his services on this important occasion he received the thanks of Parliament, and an appointment as Knight Commander of the Bath. Towards the end of July the fleet left the Baltic, and on its return to England Graves, who had been in very bad health during the greater part of the campaign, retired from active service. , captained for a time by Christopher Nesham, carried his flag in the Bay of Biscay from October 1804 to February 1805. He became a vice-admiral on 9 November 1805 and admiral on 2 August 1812.

Personal life
He was twice married, but had only one daughter. He died at his house, Woodbine Hill, near Honiton on 29 March 1814.

References

Attribution

External links
 Portrait at the National Maritime Museum

1740s births
1814 deaths
Royal Navy admirals
Royal Navy personnel of the Seven Years' War
Royal Navy personnel of the American Revolutionary War
Royal Navy personnel of the French Revolutionary Wars
Knights Companion of the Order of the Bath